Bishop Dionisio Paulo Lachovicz, O.S.B.M. (born 2 July 1946) is a Brazilian-born Ukrainian Greek Catholic hierarch. He was an Apostolic Visitor for the Ukrainian Greek Catholics in Italy (until 2019) and Spain (until 2016). Prior to this appointment, he served as a Curial Bishop of the Major Archeparchy of Kyiv-Halych from December 21, 2005, until January 19, 2009, under the title of Titular Bishop of Egnatia. From September 5, 2019, he is a Delegate with the rights of Apostolic Exarch for the Ukrainian Catholic Apostolic Exarchate of Italy.

Biography
Bishop Lachovicz was born in a family of ethnic Ukrainian Greek-Catholics in Pombas, Itaiópolis, Santa Catarina, Brazil. After attending the Basilian minor seminary, he joined the Order of Saint Basil the Great and made his first profession on January 30, 1964, followed by his solemn profession on March 30, 1970. He was ordained as a priest on December 8, 1972, after studies at St. Basil's Seminary-Studium in Curitiba. Then he continued his studies in Brazil and Italy, earning a licentiate in Theology.

After returning from Italy, he had various pastoral assignments and served as a teacher and professor at the Basilian Institutes in Brazil. From 1991 to 1996 he worked in Ukraine as a professor at and then as rector of (beginning in 1994) the Basilian Theological studies in Zolochiv. From 1996 to 2004 he was the Protoarchimandrite (General Superior) of the Basilians in Rome.

On December 21, 2005, Fr. Lachovicz was confirmed by Pope Benedict XVI as a curial bishop, and he was consecrated to the episcopacy on February 26, 2006. The principal consecrator was Cardinal Lubomyr Husar, the Major Archbishop of the Ukrainian Greek Catholic Church at that time.

References

External links

1946 births
Living people
People from Santa Catarina (state)
Brazilian people of Ukrainian descent
Brazilian Eastern Catholic bishops
21st-century Eastern Catholic bishops
Bishops of the Ukrainian Greek Catholic Church
Order of Saint Basil the Great